
Gozenzawa Glacier is located on the eastern side of Mount Ōyama in the Tateyama Mountains.

Geography 
It was the first recorded glacier in Japan. Before its identification as a glacier, it was believed that the world's most easterly glacier was on the Kamchatka Peninsula in Russia.

Exploration
The exploration of the glacier was started in 2009 by drilling a 20 m hole in Tateyama Caldera. By 2011, GPS readings showed that the glacier had moved by about 7 to 32 centimeters.

See also
List of glaciers in Japan

References

Glaciers of Japan
Landforms of Toyama Prefecture